Řehenice is a municipality and village in Benešov District in the Central Bohemian Region of the Czech Republic. It has about 400 inhabitants.

Administrative parts
Villages and hamlets of Babice, Barochov, Gabrhele, Křiváček, Malešín and Vavřetice are administrative parts of Řehenice.

Gallery

References

Villages in Benešov District